Anthony Rowland "Tony" Favell  (born 29 May 1939), is a former British Conservative Member of Parliament.

Parliamentary career
Favell first stood for Parliament in 1979 for Bolsover, but was beaten by Labour's Dennis Skinner. He later became MP for Stockport from 1983 until 1992, when he was defeated by Ann Coffey of Labour.

In 1990, Favell resigned as John Major's Parliamentary Private Secretary in a disagreement over whether the UK should enter the European Exchange Rate Mechanism.

Later life
After losing his Parliamentary seat Tony Favell, a solicitor, who was the founder of the Sheffield firm Favell Smith & Lawson, returned to the law as a consultant with Gorvins Solicitors in Stockport and became Chair of Tameside Hospital in Ashton-under-Lyne. Later he became a Tribunal Judge. In 2007 Favell was elected to High Peak Borough Council for the Hope Valley ward. He did not stand for re-election in 2015. Whilst a councillor he was appointed to Peak District National Park Authority. He was elected the Authority's Chair and became Chair of National Parks UK. Favell was awarded an MBE in 2013.

References
Times Guide to the House of Commons 1992

External links 
 
 Profile of Anthony Favell at highpeak.gov.uk

1939 births
Living people
Members of the Order of the British Empire
Conservative Party (UK) MPs for English constituencies
UK MPs 1983–1987
UK MPs 1987–1992
People educated at St Bees School
People from Edale